The Stanley River is a perennial river located in the South East region of Queensland, Australia. A major tributary of the Brisbane River, the Stanley River valley extends roughly  westwards from the area south of Maleny, through Woodford to Kilcoy before veering southwards.

Course and features
The dam was the principal water supply for Brisbane for some fifty years until the construction of the Wivenhoe Dam was completed, forming Lake Wivenhoe. The Stanley River tributaries include Ewen, Crohamhurst, London, Running, Blackrock, One Mile, Monkeybong, Delaney’s, Neurem, Stony, Marysmokes, Scrubby, Sandy, Kilcoy,
Sheepstation, Oaky, Byron and Reedy Creeks.

The river courses through one of the heaviest rainfall areas in Australia.

Riparian vegetation around the Lake Somerset area have been almost completely cleared for grazing. In the upper reaches bushland remains mostly intact although wildlife corridors have been fragmented and fish stocks reduced.

The Gastric-brooding frog is an extinct frog that was discovered in only three catchments, the Mary River, Mooloolah and Stanley Rivers. The Endangered Giant Barred Frog Mixophyes iteratu has also been recorded on the Stanley River.

History
Before either dam was built the Stanley and Brisbane Rivers were both prone to flooding. Despite warnings instigated by Henry Somerset who saw flash flooding in the upper reaches of the Stanley River valley, the 1893 Black February floods caused severe flooding downstream in Brisbane and other towns such as Fernvale.  The 1893 floods occurred after heavy rains near Peachester.

The river once marked the north-west boundary of the defunct County of Stanley.

See also

References

External links

Tributaries of the Brisbane River
South East Queensland